John Francis Lane (1 December 1928 – 15 January 2018) was an English journalist, critic and actor. He was known for being a small-part actor in many Italian films, and as a contributor to The Guardian writing obituaries for Italian cultural figures.

Biography 
Lane was born in Tankerton, a suburb of Whitstable in Kent, to a middle-class family in 1928. He became a boarder at the Royal Grammar School in Worcester, and towards the end of the Second World War attended Dulwich College in London. He then had a spell as a stage manager in London's West End.

Lane first visited Italy in 1949, following a German boyfriend from Paris, where he was then studying at the Sorbonne. After learning Italian at the University of Florence, he had settled in Rome by 1951, finding Italy more tolerant of his homosexuality than the Britain of the time. Learning Italian in Florence, he became entranced by the country after seeing Franco Zeffirelli's production of Troilus and Cressida. Zeffirelli later became one of his boyfriends.

He was made a Cavaliere in the 1975 Italian Order of Merit.

In retirement Lane lived in the town of Rende in the region of Calabria. He wrote frequently on Italian life for The Economist. His memoir, To Each His Own Dolce Vita, was published in 2013.

Lane died in January 2018 in Cosenza in southern Italy. Knowledge he had died was delayed and only emerged following the end of Zeffirelli's life.

Filmography

Bibliography

References

External links 
 

1928 births
2018 deaths
The Guardian journalists
British actors
British critics
People educated at the Royal Grammar School Worcester
People educated at Dulwich College